Surif is a Palestinian City in the Hebron Governorate located 25 km northwest of the city of Hebron. According to the Palestinian Central Bureau of Statistics census, Surif had a population of 17,650 in 2016. The population is entirely Muslim.

Most of the town's 15,000 dunams is used for agriculture, in particular, olives, wheat and barley. There are seven mosques and four schools located in its vicinity.

Ahmad Lafi is the mayor.

History
In 1838 Surif was noted as a Muslim village, located between Hebron and Gaza, but subjected to the government of Hebron.

In 1863 Victor Guérin found Surif to be a village with 700 inhabitants. He further noted that beside a birket in the rock, a few cisterns and an ancient column shaft which was placed near a small mosque, all of Surif's constructions seemed more or less modern.

An official Ottoman village list from about 1870 showed 87 houses and a population of 265, counting men only. 

In 1883, the PEF's Survey of Western Palestine described Surif as "A small village on a low hill, with olives to the south."

In 1896 the population of Surif  was estimated to be about 1164 persons.

British Mandate Era
According to the 1922 census of Palestine conducted  by the British Mandate authorities, Surif had a population of 1,265 inhabitants, all Muslims, increasing in the 1931 census  to 1,640, in 344 inhabited houses.

In  the 1945 statistics the population of  Surif   was   2,190, all  Muslims, with a total of  38,876  dunams of land  according to an official land and population survey.  Of this, 3,493  dunams were plantations and irrigable land,  11.325  for cereals, while 54 dunams were built-up (urban) land.

Jordanian era
In the wake of the 1948 Arab–Israeli War and the 1949 Armistice Agreements, Surif came under Jordanian rule.

The Jordanian census of 1961 found 2,827 inhabitants in Surif.

Post-1967
Since the Six-Day War in 1967, Surif has been under Israeli occupation.

Israel has confiscated approximately 1,213 dunams of land from Surif since 2000, and approximately 1,300 dunums of Surif lands will be behind the Israeli West Bank barrier, when it is finished.

References

Bibliography

External links
Welcome To Surif
 Surif, Welcome to Palestine
Survey of Western Palestine, Map 21:    IAA, Wikimedia commons 
 Surif Town (Fact Sheet), Applied Research Institute–Jerusalem, ARIJ
Surif Town Profile, ARIJ
Surif aerial photo, ARIJ
 The priorities and needs for development in Surif town based on the community and local authorities’ assessment, ARIJ

Towns in the West Bank
Hebron Governorate
Municipalities of the State of Palestine